Amrinder Gill is an Indian actor known for his work in Punjabi cinema and Punjabi music. In 2016, Gill won his first PTC Award for Best Actor for Angrej (2015), followed by Love Punjab (2016) and Lahoriye (2018).

PTC Punjabi Film Awards

Filmfare Awards Punjabi

PTC Punjabi Music Awards

Brit Asia Film Awards

Brit Asia TV Music Awards

References 

Gill, Amrinder
Gill, Amrinder Gill